The beach soccer tournament at the 2019 European Games was held from 25 to 29 June. It was the second edition of beach soccer at the European Games.

Eight men’s teams, comprising 96 athletes, competed over five days of competition.

Medalists

Qualification
Belarus is qualified as host country. The remaining seven teams have qualified through the 2018 Euro Beach Soccer League (EBSL). The top six teams in the Superfinal will qualify with the top team from the Promotional Final.

Draw
The draw was held on 4 April 2019 in the conference hall of the National Olympic Stadium Dynamo in Minsk, Belarus.

Seedings

Group round
All times are local (UTC+3).

Group A

Group B

Classification matches

Bracket

5–8th place semifinals

Seventh place match

Fifth place match

Knockout round

Bracket

Semifinals

Bronze medal match

Gold medal match

Final standings

References

 
Sports at the 2019 European Games
European Games
2019